Anaka General Hospital, also known as Anaka Hospital, is a hospital in the Northern Region of Uganda.

Location

Overview
Anaka General Hospital was built in the 1960s during the administration of Prime Minister Milton Obote. During the Lord's Resistance Army insurgency, the hospital was attacked, ransacked, and vandalized.

The hospital suffers from dilapidated infrastructure, antiquated or non-existent equipment, poor funding, poor staffing, poor pay, late salary payments, and low staff morale. According to a 2012 published report, the hospital had gone several years without a physician or surgeon.

Renovations
Beginning in 2014, the Uganda Ministry of Health began renovating this hospital, using a loan from the World Bank. The improvements, which cost UGX:18.65 billion, included the following: 1. New, bigger outpatients' department 2. Build a mortuary 3. Enlarge the private wing for paying patients 4. Renovate the existing staff housing 5. Renovate the hospital's water source 6. Rehabilitate the hospital's water supply pipe system, both outside and inside the facility 7. Rehabilitate the hospital's sewerage disposal system, both inside and outside the buildings 8. Construct an emergency room (casualty department) 9. Construct a psychiatric department 10. Build an intensive care unit.

See also
List of hospitals in Uganda

References

External links 
 Website of Uganda Ministry of Health
 Hospitals get facelift, but far from better service delivery

Hospital buildings completed in 1969
Anaka
Nwoya District
Acholi sub-region
Northern Region, Uganda
Hospitals established in 1969
1969 establishments in Uganda